As I Am is the seventh and, to date, final studio album by American Christian singer-songwriter Kim Boyce. It is her first and only release on Diadem Music Group, distributed by Benson Records in 1997. Like her previous album By Faith, As I Am continues her adult contemporary sound. Boyce duets with her husband Gary Koreiba on the track "Amazing Love for Me". Production duties were done by Bryan Lenox while James Hollihan, Jr. (Russ Taff) produced the track "The Sound of Your Voice".

Track listing

Note: "The Sound of Your Voice" was produced by James Hollihan, Jr. All other tracks were produced by Bryan Lenox.

Personnel 
 Kim Boyce – vocals 
 Pat Coil – keyboards (1, 6), acoustic piano (2, 4, 7), keyboard pad (3), Hammond B3 organ (8)
 Dennis Patton – keyboards (2), percussion (2, 4), Hammond B3 organ (4), acoustic piano (6), accordion (6), programming (9)
 Marc Q. Harris – acoustic piano (8)
 James Hollihan, Jr. – acoustic piano (10), arrangements (10)
 Mark Baldwin – acoustic guitar (1-4, 7), 12-string acoustic guitar (6), guitars (8)
 Jerry McPherson – electric guitar (1-4, 7), Hawaiian guitar (2), all electric guitars (6), guitars (8)
 Glenn Pearce – guitar solo (1), acoustic guitar (4, 7), guitars (9)
 Matt Slocum – electric guitar (4), cello (7)
 Danny O'Lannerghty – bass (1-4, 6, 7, 8)
 Matt Pierson – bass (10)
 John Hammond – drums (1-4, 6, 7, 8), percussion (6)
 Steve Grossman – drums (10)
 Eric Darken – percussion (1, 3, 6, 7)
 Bryan Lenox – percussion (1, 3, 5, 6)
 Matt Davich – woodwinds (10)
 Robbie Shankle – woodwinds (10)
 Leslie Norton – French horn (10)
 Chris McDonald – string arrangements and conductor (2, 3, 5)
 John Darnall – string conductor (10)
 Nashville String Machine – strings (2, 3, 5, 10)
 Michael English – backing vocals (1)
 Gary Koreiba – backing vocals (1, 6), vocals (9)
 Bo Cooper – backing vocals (2), acoustic piano (3, 5)
 Todd Cooper – backing vocals (2)

Choir on "Nothing in the World"
 Marshall Hall, Nikki Hassman, Gary Koreiba, Nicol Smith and Todd Smith

Production and Technical 
 Larry Day – executive producer 
 Bryan Lenox – engineer (1-9), mixing (1-9)
 James Hollihan, Jr. – recording (10), mixing (10)
 Rob Burrell – assistant engineer (1-9), production assistant (1-9)
 Amanda Seers – assistant engineer (1-9)
 Aaron Swihart – assistant engineer (1-9)
 Lynn Fuston – additional engineer (10)
 Mike Rapp – art direction 
 Robert Ascroft – design 
 Chris Nichols – photography 
 Jamie Kearney – stylist
 Carol Maxwell – hair, make-up

Critical reception

Mike Rimmer of Cross Rhythms praised the album saying that "motherhood brings a new source of inspiration, reflected in many of the songs. 'Who Hung The Moon' is a child's question that brings Kim back to the wonder of creation in a jazz-tinged piece of MOR! There's more jazz when she turns in a stunning lounge singer performance on 'The Sound Of Your Voice'. Clearly the adult Kim is pushing out the musical boat and enjoying herself! One ballad stands out, the beautiful 'Remember Me', which is a communion song and has a touch of Whitney about it. Just a gorgeous song. The duet with husband Gary Koreiba "Amazing Love For Me" is another song born out of Kim's experience of parenting, this time a realisation of how much the Father gave to us in sending Jesus."

Radio singles

References

1997 albums
Kim Boyce albums